St. Paul High School may refer to:

Canada
St. Paul High School (Ottawa), Nepean, Ontario
Saint Paul Catholic High School, Niagara Falls, Ontario

United States
St. Paul High School (Arkansas), St. Paul, Arkansas
St. Paul High School (Santa Fe Springs, California)
St. Paul Catholic High School, Bristol, Connecticut
St. Paul High School, St. Paul, Kansas
St. Paul High School (Grosse Pointe Farms, Michigan)
St. Paul High School (Nebraska), a high school in St. Paul, Nebraska
St. Paul High School (Ohio), Norwalk, Ohio
St. Paul High School (Oregon), St. Paul, Oregon
St. Paul High School (Shiner, Texas)
St. Paul High School (Virginia), St. Paul, Virginia

See also
St. Paul's High School (disambiguation)
St. Paul's School (disambiguation)
Saint Paul (disambiguation)